Ham and eggs is a dish combining various preparations of those two ingredients. It has been described as a staple of "an old-fashioned American breakfast". It is also served as a lunch and dinner dish. Some notable people have professed an affinity for the dish, such as American entrepreneur Duncan Hines and the Manchurian Emperor Puyi. Similar dishes include bacon and eggs, Spanish eggs, the Denver omelette and Eggs Benedict.

The term ham and eggs and some variations of it have been used in various cultural contexts. It has been used as a slang term in the United States, and has also been used to refer to various entities and events there.

Overview
Ham and eggs is a popular dish often served as a breakfast meal in the United States. It is also consumed as a dinner or supper dish, for example in parts of the Southern United States, and is sometimes served as a lunch dish. Eggs served with the dish can be fried, scrambled or poached. Additional ingredients such as tomatoes and seasonings, such as herbes de Provence, are sometimes used. The dish can be prepared on a stovetop in a skillet or frying pan, and also baked or broiled in an oven.

The pan juices or gravy from the ham is sometimes drizzled atop the eggs to add flavor.  The dish's quality can be enhanced by using high-quality ham and cooking the ingredients over low heat, which prevents overcooking.  A recipe for country-style ham and eggs includes reducing cream in the pan after the ham and eggs have been cooked, and then dolloping it atop the dish. Ham and eggs can be accompanied with side dishes such as toast and hash browns, among others.

Aficionados

Duncan Hines
Duncan Hines, an American entrepreneur, often enjoyed ham and eggs as a supper meal. He said that people should choose ham and eggs as a meal at a diner when uncertain about what to order, because cooks cannot "disguise a bad egg nor spoil a slice of good ham."

According to his own account, on one occasion in 1899, Hines ordered five dollars'  ($143.60 in 2015 dollars) worth of ham and eggs at Harry Hynd's Restaurant in Cheyenne, Wyoming, a very large amount of food. The counter person initially refused the order, saying that it would be impossible to finish it, but Hines was eventually provided with a large platter of ham and eggs and ate it all. Years later he wrote that nothing else had tasted as good as that platter of ham and eggs at that time.

Henry Puyi
When Henry Puyi became Kang Teh, Emperor of the Manchurian Empire,  a 1934 Associated Press story noted his taste for ham and eggs and other Western-style dishes.

Similar dishes
Bacon and eggs is a similar dish, as is Eggs Benedict, which is prepared using bacon, Canadian bacon or ham and poached eggs as main ingredients. Spanish eggs consists of ham and eggs served atop heavily seasoned boiled rice. Ham and eggs are two of the main ingredients in the Denver omelette.

The term in culture

Slang references
The term "ham and eggs" and variations of it have had various slang meanings. In rhyming slang it refers to legs; the phrase was also used with this meaning in the U.S. in the 1920s. "Like ham and eggs" refers to things that typically go together and are difficult to separate. To "ham and egg it" is to plug away at something. "Ham and eggs"  or "ham and egger" can also refer to an ordinary, unskilled or mediocre person. A specific example of this is a boxer "with a minimum of talent"; "ham and egger" occurs in this context in the original Rocky film, filmed in 1975, when Rocky downplays his chances as a title contender, referring to himself as "really a ham-and-egger". Similarly, "ham and egger" / "ham and egging" are both used in rhyming slang to describe a "beggar", and the act of "begging", respectively.

Baseball
"Ham and Egger" refers to a double play. An older phrase, Sonoma State Baseball coach Casey Gilroy is a major proponent for use of "Ham and Egger" to describe what others may call a "tailor made" double play. "Ham and egger" is one of many food related phrases found in baseball, including: "high cheese", "can of corn", "pickle", "tater", "meat ball", "pea", "cup of coffee", "hot stove", "butcher boy", "jam", and "pepper".

Harriman Alaska Expedition
Participants in the Harriman Alaska Expedition of 1899 sometimes referred to the expedition as "the H.A.E." or "Ham and Eggs". Some participants in the expedition later participated in the "Ham and Eggs Club", a group of expedition members in the United States who reunited periodically. The group was formed when Louis Agassiz Fuertes declared in a letter that the H.A.E. had "resolved itself into the Ham and Eggs Club". John Muir hosted meetings in California, and John Burroughs often hosted meetings on the East Coast.

In politics

The Ham and Eggs Movement was a grassroots movement and organization in California that placed a billion-dollar pension plan on the state ballot in 1938 as a proposed state constitutional amendment, named Proposition 25. Under the proposal, the state would have issued scrip payments to unemployed residents over the age of 50. After 1,103,000 California residents signed a petition, the proposal was voted on a second time in a special election in 1939, but despite what the New York Times called a "huge off-year vote", it was defeated two-to-one.

Events
For over forty years, the Lancaster Men's Chorus on the Ohio University Lancaster campus has performed an annual concert called the "Ham & Eggs Show".

See also

 Bacon, egg and cheese sandwich – a breakfast sandwich
 Denver sandwich
 Green Eggs and Ham – a children's book by Dr. Seuss
 Ham and cheese sandwich
 Ham and egg bun
 List of breakfast dishes
 List of egg dishes
 List of ham dishes
 Scrambled eggs

Notes

References

Further reading

External links
 

Egg dishes
Ham dishes
Breakfast dishes
Food combinations